A-Day is an annual college football exhibition game set at the conclusion of spring practice by the University of Alabama Crimson Tide. Played on-campus at Bryant–Denny Stadium in Tuscaloosa, Alabama, the game features teams composed of offensive starters against defensive starters of the Crimson Tide. National Collegiate Athletic Association (NCAA) rules allow for member schools to conduct a series of fifteen practice sessions during the spring months. As part of these practices the NCAA allows three 11-on-11 scrimmages, one of which may be conducted as a spring game.

Prior to the game, the captains from the  previous seasons' team are honored at the annual "Walk of Fame" ceremony at the base of Denny Chimes. In addition to this ceremony, several other memorable events have occurred as part of the annual A-Day festivities. The 1967 edition of the game saw Dock Rone and Andrew Pernell participate and become the first African American players to play at Denny Stadium as members of the Crimson Tide football team. At halftime of the 1976 game, Denny Stadium was officially rededicated as Bryant–Denny Stadium in honor of then head coach Bear Bryant. The 1985 edition of the A-Day game featured a White team of current, varsity starters against a Crimson team of former Alabama players such as Ken Stabler and Ozzie Newsome.

Since the arrival of head coach Nick Saban in 2007, A-Day has become a major event. The 2007 game saw an overflow crowd of 92,138 in attendance and served as the catalyst for other programs to make their spring game a larger event. The growth of A-Day has resulted in its being televised nationally by ESPN first in 2009 and again in subsequent years in addition to being utilized to enhance recruiting.

History
Originally, the A-Day game was called the Spring Training Football Game and was played on Alumni Day. Alumni Day was a day devoted to alumni and typically consisted of coffees, luncheons, tours, the football game, and an alumni dinner. Recently, there has been an alumni flag football game inside the Bryant-Denny Stadium preceding the A-Day game.

Key

Games

Notes

References
General

Specific

A-Day